State Line is an unincorporated community in Cherokee County, in the U.S. state of South Carolina.

History
A post office called State Line was established in 1875, and remained in operation until 1904. The community was so named for its location near the South Carolina—North Carolina state line.

References

Unincorporated communities in Cherokee County, South Carolina
Unincorporated communities in South Carolina